Vasey is a surname. Notable people with the surname include:

George Vasey (botanist) (1822–1893), English-born American botanist
George Alan Vasey (1895–1945), Australian soldier; husband of Jessie Vasey
Gladys Vasey (1889–1981), English artist
Jessie Vasey (1897–1966), founder the War Widows' Guild of Australia; wife of George Alan Vasey
Percy Vasey (1883–1952), English cricketer and schoolmaster
Malcolm Vasey (1942–), Well known Speedway Manager with Stoke Potters 2010 to date
William J (Bill) Vasey (1939–), Wyoming State Senator, Democrat, Senate District 11, Albany/Carbon/Sweetwater ; House 1989-1994 Senate 1999-2009

References